Horst Kleinert is a retired East German slalom canoeist who competed from the mid-1950s to the early 1960s. He won eight medals at the ICF Canoe Slalom World Championships with four golds (C-2: 1957, 1959; C-2 team: 1959, 1961), two silvers (C-2: 1955, C-2 team: 1955) and a bronze (C-2: 1961, C-2 team: 1957).

References
ICF medalists for Olympic and World Championships - Part 2: rest of flatwater (now sprint) and remaining canoeing disciplines: 1936-2007.

German male canoeists
Possibly living people
Year of birth missing (living people)
Medalists at the ICF Canoe Slalom World Championships